Edward Ironside may refer to:

 Edward Ironside (Lord Mayor of London) (1705–1753), British banker and Lord Mayor of London
 Edward Ironside (topographer) (c. 1736–1803), British topographer

See also 
 Edmund Ironside (disambiguation)